Gazoryctra is a genus of moths of the family Hepialidae. There are 14 described species found in Eurasia, Canada and the United States.

Species 

Gazoryctra chishimana – Kuril Islands
Gazoryctra confusus – United States
Gazoryctra fuscoargenteus – northern Eurasia
Gazoryctra ganna – Europe
Gazoryctra hyperboreus – Canada
Gazoryctra lembertii – United States
Gazoryctra macilentus – Siberia
Gazoryctra mathewi – United States
Gazoryctra mcglashani – United States
Gazoryctra novigannus – Canada
Gazoryctra pulcher – United States
Gazoryctra roseicaput – Canada
Gazoryctra sciophanes – United States
Gazoryctra wielgusi – United States

External links
Hepialidae genera

Hepialidae
Exoporia genera
Taxa named by Jacob Hübner